The 1970 Miami Dolphins season was the team's fifth, and first in the National Football League (NFL). It was the team's first winning season, first playoff appearance, and first of 26 seasons under head coach Don Shula. The team improved on their 3–10–1 record from 1969, and finished the regular season at 10–4, second in the newly-aligned AFC East to only the Baltimore Colts, the eventual Super Bowl champion. In 1970, the Dolphins defeated the New York Jets and the Oakland Raiders for the first time in franchise history.

The Dolphins got off to a fresh start at 4–1, but lost three straight to even their record at 4–4. Miami then won six straight to end the season to clinch their first-ever winning season and playoff berth, as the wild card team. They met the Oakland Raiders in the opening divisional round, whom they had defeated in Miami in early October, but lost 21–14 on the road in the sun and mud.

Shula had moved over to the Dolphins on February 18, 1970, after seven seasons as head coach of the Baltimore Colts, now in the same division.

Offseason

NFL Draft

Personnel

Staff

Roster

Regular season

Schedule 

Saturday (October 3, 10), Monday (November 30)
Note: Intra-division opponents are in bold text.

Standings

Postseason

References

External links 
 1970 Miami Dolphins at Pro-Football-Reference.com

Miami
Miami Dolphins seasons
Miami Dolphins